The El Salvador Olympic Committee (IOC code: ESA) is the National Olympic Committee for El Salvador. It was founded in 1925, and officially recognized by the International Olympic Committee in 1938.

See also
El Salvador at the Olympics

External links
  
 NOC Profile at Olympic.org

El Salvador at the Olympics
National Olympic Committees
Olympics
1925 establishments in El Salvador